Francesca Pisciali (born 19 May 1998) is an Italian professional racing cyclist, who currently rides for UCI Women's Continental Team . In August 2020, she rode in the 2020 Strade Bianche Women's race in Italy.

References

External links
 

1998 births
Living people
Italian female cyclists
Place of birth missing (living people)
Sportspeople from Bolzano
Cyclists from Trentino-Alto Adige/Südtirol